Eugenio Bani (born 13 January 1991 in Pisa) is an Italian cyclist riding for .

Major results
2009
 1st Stage 4 Giro di Toscana Junior
 2nd Trofeo Buffoni
 7th European Junior Road Race Championships
2016
 1st Stage 4 Vuelta al Táchira
 3rd GP Adria Mobil
 4th Massawa Circuit

References

1991 births
Living people
Italian male cyclists
Sportspeople from Pisa
Cyclists from Tuscany